Doctor Bull is a 1933 American pre-Code comedy film directed by John Ford, based on the James Gould Cozzens novel The Last Adam. Will Rogers portrays a small-town doctor who must deal with a typhoid outbreak in the community.

The film was well praised by The New York Times, which noted that the story is similar to that of Lionel Barrymore's film One Man's Journey when it premiered at the Radio City Music Hall in New York City.  Andy Devine met his future wife during the making of this picture. The film was one of Fox's biggest hits of the year.

Plot

Cast

References

External links

1933 films
1933 comedy films
American comedy films
American black-and-white films
Films directed by John Ford
Fox Film films
1930s English-language films
1930s American films